Shirley Field, also known as Scott Airfield, located off US 80 just east of Tallulah, Louisiana, dates from 1922.  It was listed on the National Register of Historic Places on February 14, 1985.  The listing included two contributing buildings and a contributing site.

It is notable in the area of agriculture for its role in the development of cotton crop dusting, to control boll weevils.

The field includes a Mission Revival-style terminal with round arch windows and a metal tile roof.  It also includes a frame hangar from the 1920s, as well as two hangars from the 1950s.

See also
 National Register of Historic Places listings in Madison Parish, Louisiana

References

Historic districts on the National Register of Historic Places in Louisiana
Mission Revival architecture in Louisiana
Buildings and structures completed in 1922
Madison Parish, Louisiana
Airports in Louisiana
Airports on the National Register of Historic Places
Buildings and structures on the National Register of Historic Places in Louisiana